Onslaught are a British thrash metal band from Bristol, England, active from 1982 to 1991 and again since 2005. The band initially drew influences from US and British hardcore punk bands such as Discharge and The Exploited, as well as the new wave of British heavy metal, and eventually adopted a straightforward thrash metal sound. They have been recognised as pioneers of the British thrash metal scene, and are often referred to as one of the country's so-called "big four", along with Sabbat, Xentrix and Acid Reign. To date, Onslaught have released seven studio albums, one compilation, four singles and two live recordings: a live album and a live DVD.

History

Origins and Power from Hell (1982–1985)
Onslaught were formed in 1982 in Bristol, England, by guitarist Nige Rockett and drummer Steve Grice. The two musicians were working to forge an ultra-aggressive, speed metal sound that was becoming more popular in the days of early Slayer and Metallica. In 1985, the duo were joined by bass player Jase Stallard and vocalist Paul Mahoney. The quartet quickly worked up enough material for a record and later that year, the debut album, Power from Hell, was recorded and released on the British independent record label, Cor.

The band started to write more heavy metal–oriented songs, rather than their original punk sound. This was mainly influenced by the early releases of thrash metal bands, albeit with a darker sound. The band signed to Children of the Revolution Records, and released their album, Power from Hell, in 1985 as a result. As with other metal bands of the time, the lyrics were often Satanic, and the cover showed a demon emerging from a pentagram.

The Force, In Search of Sanity and breakup (1985–1991)
Jase Stallard (who had joined Onslaught in 1984) retained his place in the band, but took over bass duties from a hired bassist, who in turn assumed the role of rhythm guitarist, giving the band a second guitarist. During the first months of 1986, the new line-up was ready to record their second album, The Force, in a recording studio in London. The album was released early that year through the label Under One Flag, and Onslaught toured for about two-and-a-half years in support of it, playing with bands such as Motörhead, Exciter, Girlschool, Kreator, Nuclear Assault, Agent Steel, the Crumbsuckers, Angel Dust, Exumer, Messiah, Sabbat and a then-still unknown Anthrax. The album was much more successful than Power from Hell, and is considered a classic by many critics and fanzines. Chris Dahlkvist left the band later in 1986 and was replaced by James Hinder.

In 1987, Jase Stallard's guitar playing came into question, so Rockett dismissed him and replaced him with Rob Trotman. Using this line-up, they set out to write material for a third studio album. Having drawn the attention of London Records, the label signed the band. In mid-1988, the band began to start recording their third album, In Search of Sanity. Upon hearing the album, the record label felt that a more versatile vocalist was needed, to do the music more justice. Although the band felt that Sy Keeler's vocals on the demo recording had the right sound, the production had a more polished sound – hence the need for a more polished vocalist. Steve Grimmett, formerly of NWOBHM act Grim Reaper, was drafted in to replace the departing Sy Keeler. Owing to this development, the release of the album was delayed until mid 1989. Following the success of The Force, and with an accomplished new singer, there was much pre-release publicity. In Search of Sanity had a much different sound than Onslaught's previous releases; while it is technically a thrash metal album, it saw them shift towards a progressive/power metal sound, and included the band's longest track to date "Welcome to Dying". Many hardcore thrash metal fans were disappointed with these changes, and this partially contributed to the band's demise. Despite the mixed critical reaction, In Search of Sanity is Onslaught's only album to enter the UK Albums Chart, peaking at No. 46, while the cover version of AC/DC's "Let There Be Rock" was the band's only single to appear in the UK Singles chart, peaking at No. 50. Onslaught toured for over a year in support of In Search of Sanity, playing alongside Annihilator, Xentrix, Slammer, the Crumbsuckers, Horse (not to be confused with the metalcore band from California), Drunken State, Sabbat and Dead On.

In early 1990, Steve Grimmett decided to leave the band due to personal reasons, and was replaced by Tony O'Hora. The band then set out to write and then record a fourth album. London Records decided not to renew their contract with Onslaught, leaving the band without a record deal. Roadrunner offered them £50,000 but Rockett declined to sign for an indie label, and they decided to disband in early 1991. Tony O'Hora later sung for Praying Mantis and later became the lead singer of the Sweet.

Reunion and more albums (2005–2018)
In 2005, the band was reformed by Steve Grice and was joined by Sy Keeler, Nige Rockett, and James Hinder. They were joined by the Welsh guitarist, Alan Jordan. Writing for the band's fourth album, Killing Peace, began in 2005, and the album was released in early 2007. Bassist James Hinder left the band in 2006, before the release of Killing Peace, and was replaced by Jeff Williams. This line-up recorded a live DVD in Club Stodola, Warsaw, Poland, which was released in 2007 by Metal Mind Productions under the title Live Polish Assault.

In 2008, Jordan left the band and was replaced by guitarist Andy Rosser-Davies. In November of that year, the band recorded their live performance at the Damnation Festival in Leeds resulting in a live album (Dual Disc CD / DVD), Live Damnation; mixed by Andy Sneap, it was released in August 2009 by Candlelight Records. In June 2010, the band signed to the German metal label AFM Records to record their fifth studio album, Sounds of Violence, released in January 2011. On 25 March 2011, Steve Grice decided to leave the band on the eve of a major European tour. Michael Hourihan (Extreme Noise Terror / Desecration) replaced him for the tour and in November 2011 became a full member of the band. Onslaught recorded their sixth studio album, VI, from April to May and released it on 20 September 2013.

Former Anthrax singer Neil Turbin joined the band for their Thrash Invasion tour of US and Canada, Brazil and Chile, North and South America in 2014 as Sy Keeler was unable to take part due to family problems. He left the tour for the last week of shows after performing at The Music Hall, Anaheim, California, on 24 November 2014, only two days before the tour ended.

The band played the 10th edition of Hellfest in June 2015.

On 14 September 2015, Onslaught announced that they had recruited Iain GT Davies as a full-time replacement for Andy Rosser Davies. However, the band stated that Andy Rosser Davies was going to contribute to the songwriting of their next album.

On 27 March 2018, guitarist Iain GT Davies and drummer Mic Hourihan parted ways with Onslaught, to focus on other bands and projects. Rockett said that their replacements had already been chosen, but had not yet been revealed. He then said that the band would perform a new song from their then-upcoming seventh album at Bloodstock Open Air. On 16 July 2018, it was announced that guitarist Wayne Dorman and Drummer James Perry had joined the band.

Generation Antichrist, split with Sy Keeler and next album (2018–present)
On 18 November 2018, Onslaught posted a teaser video on Facebook, confirming that they were recording their seventh studio album at Grindstone Studios. The band released the video for their first song in six years "A Perfect Day to Die" in March 2019, which is "a nod to [their] sadly departed friends from Motörhead who were a major influence for Onslaught over the years."

On 29 April 2020, Onslaught announced that vocalist Sy Keeler had once again parted ways with the band, citing his reason as, "Due to the nature of the modern-day music industry, some things simply aren't sustainable year after year and Sy has now taken a different full-time career path." A few days later, it was announced that Keeler was replaced by Dave Garnett, who had previously performed in Onslaught by filling in for him the House of Metal festival in Umeå, Sweden that past February.

On 12 May 2020, Onslaught announced that their seventh studio album, titled Generation Antichrist, would be released on 7 August.

In March 2021, about seven months after the release of Generation Antichrist, Rockett announced that Onslaught have been working on their eighth studio album, which is currently in pre-production and planned for release in 2022. Guitarist Wayne Dorman confirmed in a post on Facebook in December 2021 that he has begun writing new material for the band's new album.

Members

Current members
Nige Rockett – guitar (1982–1991, 2005–present)
Jeff Williams – bass (2006–present)
James Perry – drums (2018–present)
Wayne Dorman – guitar (2018–present)
Dave Garnett – vocals (2020–present)

Former members
Steven Grice – drums (1982–1991, 2005–2011)
Jase Pope – vocals (1982–1983)
Roge Davies – vocals (1983–1984)
Paul Mahoney – vocals (1984–1985), bass (1985–1986)
Sy Keeler – vocals (1985–1988, 2005–2020)
Steve Grimmett – vocals (1988–1990)
Tony O'Hora – vocals (1990–1991)
Paul Hill – bass (1982–1983)
Paul Davis – bass (1983–1984)
Jase Stallard – bass (1984–1985), guitar (1985–1987)
James Hinder – bass (1986–1991, 2005–2006)
Rob Trotman – guitar (1987–1991)
Alan Jordan – guitar (2005–2008)
Andy Rosser-Davies – guitar (2008–2015)
Mike Hourihan – drums (2011–2018)
Leigh Chambers – lead guitar (2013–2015)
Iain GT Davies – guitar (2015–2018)

Fill-in members
Neil Turbin – vocals (2014)

Timeline

Discography

Studio albums
Power from Hell (1985)
The Force (1986)
In Search of Sanity (1989) – UK No. 46
Killing Peace (2007)
Sounds of Violence (2011)
VI (2013)
Generation Antichrist (2020)

Compilation albums
Shadow of Death (2008, compilation of early demos)

Singles
"Let There Be Rock" (AC/DC cover, 1987, originally released on Music for Nations)
"Let There Be Rock" (AC/DC cover, 1989, re-recorded and released on London Records) – UK No. 50
"Welcome to Dying" (1989, London Records)
"Shellshock" (1989, London Records)
"Bomber" (Motörhead cover)/"The Sound of Violence" (17 December 2010) – "Bomber" features Phil Campbell from Motörhead on guitar and Tom Angelripper from Sodom on vocals. "The Sound of Violence" is taken from the AFM album Sounds of Violence.
"A Perfect Day to Die" (8 March 2019)
"Religiousuicide" (29 May 2020)

Live albums
Live Damnation (2009)
Onslaught LIVE at SLAUGHTERHOUSE  Recorded at London O2 ACADEMY Islington (2014)

DVDs
Live Polish Assault 2007 (2007)
Onslaught LIVE at SLAUGHTERHOUSE Filmed at O2 ACADEMY Bristol (Bristol) SAT 19th July And the O2 ACADEMY Islington (London) 20th July (2014)

References

External links
 
 
 
 

English thrash metal musical groups
Musical groups from Bristol
London Records artists
Musical groups established in 1982
1982 establishments in England
Candlelight Records artists